This is a list of heads of the Central Bosnia Canton.

Heads of the Central Bosnia Canton (1996–present)

Governors

Prime Ministers

Notes

External links
World Statesmen - Central Bosnia Canton

Central Bosnia Canton